Hargovind Bhargava is an Indian agricultural economist, politician and a former MLA. He is a PhD degree holder assistant professor of agricultural economics and was a member of 17th Legislative Assembly of Uttar Pradesh & 15th Legislative Assembly of Uttar Pradesh. He represented Sidhauli constituency of Uttar Pradesh twice.

Education and academic career
He is educated in Chandra Shekhar Azad (CSA) University of Agriculture and Technology, Kanpur (B.Sc.Ag., M.Sc.Ag, PhD), Punjab Technical University, Jalandhar (MBA) and Chhatrapati Shahu Ji Maharaj (CSJM) University, Kanpur (B.Ed.). Later in 2012, he was appointed as an assistant professor at Kulbhaskar Ashram PG College's Agricultural Economics and Statistics department.

Political career
Bhargava has been a second time member of the 17th Legislative Assembly of Uttar Pradesh. Since 2017, he has represented the Sidhauli constituency and is a member of the BSP. He was also a member of Assembly between 2007-2012.

Political posts held

See also
Uttar Pradesh Legislative Assembly

References

Uttar Pradesh MLAs 2017–2022
Bahujan Samaj Party politicians from Uttar Pradesh
Living people
Year of birth missing (living people)
Samajwadi Party politicians from Uttar Pradesh